McKay Tower is a building in downtown Grand Rapids, Michigan, located on Monroe Center. The building is mixed-use for apartments, office space, retail and is a venue for events. It is currently the fifth tallest building in Grand Rapids.

History

19th century
The location of McKay Tower is where the first non-Native American marriage took place in Grand Rapids in 1834, only a few years after settlers arrived and the area was surveyed as part of the Michigan Territory. The marriage took place in a cabin that was owned by the American pioneer, Joel Guild which involved his daughter Harriet Guild and Barney Burton. The first town meeting was also held at the cabin that had a total number of nine voters.

20th century
The Wonderly Building was then built on the location in 1890. The first two floors of McKay Tower were then built in their current manner in 1915 and the building was then known as the Grand Rapids National Bank. Another 11 floors were added between 1921 and 1927. In 1942, the tower was bought from the Grand Rapids National Bank by Grand Rapids businessman and politician, Frank D. McKay. In the early 1940s, two additional mechanical floors were added to the tower.

From the completion of the tower in 1927 to 1983, the McKay Tower was the tallest building in Grand Rapids until the completion of the Amway Grand tower. The McKay Tower was also the tallest office building in Grand Rapids until Bridgewater Place was completed in 1993.

21st century
In 2000, the University of Michigan, which acquired the building from McKay's will, sold the tower. The building was sold to Greystone Associates later that year. Mark Roller, an internet businessman, purchased the tower in 2006 for $7.8 million, who later listed the property for sale in 2009 for $11 million.

McKay Tower was sold to Jonathan L. Borisch, founder of  Borisch Manufacturing Corp. (now Amphenol Borisch) in May 2012 for $10.5 million through his Steadfast Property Holdings company. In January 2020, the Match-e-be-nash-she-wish Band of Pottawatomi Indians of Michigan and the Huron Band of the Potawatomi purchased McKay Tower for $17.5 million from Steadfast Property Holdings.

Architecture
McKay Tower is a Greek Revival structure. The tower currently has a three-story penthouse and a metal dome.

Gallery

See also
 History of Grand Rapids, Michigan
 List of tallest buildings in Grand Rapids

References

Skyscrapers in Grand Rapids, Michigan
Skyscraper office buildings in Michigan
Office buildings completed in 1927
1927 establishments in Michigan